Bangladesh International Recovery Developments, also known as BIRD , based in Bangladesh and United Kingdom, is one of the first and few youth-based Bangladeshi students communities and non-profit organisation, established in December 2011. It is one of the first UK based Bangladeshi students communities in Britain. BIRD operates with the help of hundreds of volunteers from different countries like Bangladesh, United Kingdom and Qatar, also it arranges various fundraising events to run BIRD Schools BIRD runs few schools for underprivileged children in Dhaka and Savar and also it regularly hosts charity concerts to raise funds BIRD is registered in England and Wales with the charity commission.

History

The idea of BIRD first came from the founder and president Kaisar Al Islam in September 2011 who was then a student, studying in a flying school in London. He saw the differences between the lifestyle of people in England and Bangladesh and how a few pound could make a huge difference in the life of a street child in Bangladesh. From that realisation he founded the charity along with his two friends in December 2011

Objectives

The relief of poverty, sickness, hardship, and distress of children and the advancement of education for the public benefit of children in particular but not exclusively orphans, street children and underprivileged children and their families, primarily living in Bangladesh and other developing counties as the trustees see fit, by providing goods and services.

Education

BIRD operates few tuition fee free schools in Dhaka

Social Activities

In 2012, BIRD arranged a lot of events with underprivileged children i.e. Food Giveaway, Painting Competition, Just for warmth etc. In 2013, BIRD arranged a charity concert called "Let's fly" to raise funds for BIRD Schools where bands like Arbovirus (band), Nemesis (Bangladeshi band) performed. Half of the money was donated to the victims of Savar Tragedy.

BIRD 4 SAVAR

BIRD 4 SAVAR is a sister concern of Bangladesh International Recovery Developments. BIRD 4 SAVAR is dedicated to the people who were affected by Savar Tragedy 2013. The purpose of BIRD 4 Savar is to work with the families and people who lost their major earners during the building collapse of Rana Plaza in 2013. A number of families has already been helped. In 2013 a Qatar-based fashion house named 'LAS Fashion' partnered with BIRD and hosted a fashion show to raise funds for the victims of 2013 Savar building collapse. BIRD has been working on the rehabilitation of the victims of 2013 Savar building collapse

Board

 Kaisar Al Islam, Founder and President
 Chelsea Victoria Needham, Vice-president
 Tahsin Upa, General Secretary
 Tazreen Sikder, Project Manager

Awards and nominations
 Muslim Awards  - Nominated for the best   Muslim Association of the year - 2014

References

External links

Youth organisations based in Bangladesh
Organizations established in 2011